Roller skiing is an off-snow equivalent to cross-country skiing. Roller skis have wheels on their ends and are used on a hard surface, to emulate . The skiing techniques used are very similar to techniques used in cross-country skiing on snow.

First created as a summer training exercise, roller skiing grew into a competitive sport in its own right. Annual championships are held in various locations around the world. Most, if not all, national cross-country ski teams around the world roller ski during the off-season for specific physical training simulating winter skiing. In Norway, separate roller ski facilities have been constructed to allow exercise off public roads.

History
The first roller skis were built in the mid-1930s in Italy and North Europe. In the early 1950s, when cross-country skiing started to evolve to a serious competition sport, the necessity for good summer training grew. Starting in the 1950s people experimented with skis on wheels. In the 1970s, something of a standard emerged and the first races took place. At this time all roller skis had one wheel in front and two wheels at the back. The metal frame was between 70 and 100 centimetres (2'4" and 3'4") long.
 
Athletes felt they could start to engage themselves in competitions. In 1976, Giustino Del Vecchio, an air pilot, established a record in Monza by doing  in 24 hours on the roller skis he had designed, using material and technologies from the aircraft industry; narrow solid wheels with hard tread, reverse lock-up ball bearings to enable a forward push off the inactive ski.

In the beginning, the skis were developed with one wheel in front and two wheels behind. The introduction of skating (free technique) in cross-country skiing changed athletes' training needs, which consequently impacted the design of roller skis. New roller skis with two wheels instead of three and much lighter materials could be used both for the classic style and skating.

Competition

The European Rollerski Federation was established around 1985, and the first European Championships were organized in the Netherlands in 1988. 
 
The growth of the roller ski sport attracted the notice of the International Ski Federation, or FIS (Federation Internationale de Ski). In 1992, the FIS recognized roller skiing as a sport distinct from cross-country skiing.

The first World Games were held in The Hague in 1993, and the first World Cup roller ski races later in the same year. In 1998, in Prague, the FIS granted roller skiing an official FIS World Championships. On 30 August- 3 September 2000, these competitions took place in the Netherlands.
 
Races have a variety of formats with different terrain. Formats include relays, sprints, team races, individual races and pursuit races. Terrain varies from relatively flat to hilly. On flat courses the speed can be as fast as 50 kilometres per hour (30 miles per hour). Average speed on flat tracks in World Cup races can easily be 30 kilometres per hour (20 miles per hour). As in regular cross-country skiing, the skiers compete in classic and freestyle. Helmets and protective eyeglasses in competitions are mandatory.

World Cup and World Championships
Like their cross-country counterparts, the Italian, Russian, Norwegian, Swedish, German and French rollers have been very strong in competitions compared to other nations since the beginning of competitive roller skiing. Note that World Roller Skiing championships are not officially sanctioned races by FIS or recognized sports governing bodies.

Men
So far, the World Cup and World Championships have been dominated by a few skiers. Successful roller skiers include Italian Alfio di Gregorio, who has won the World Games three times and World Cup four times; Russian Igor Glushkov, who has won the World Cup three times; and Frenchman Vincent Vittoz, who won the World Championships in 2002.

Women
Mateja Bogatec from Italy has been one of the most successful female rollers since the beginning of the FIS World Cup in 2000.

Equipment

Roller skis for classic and skate style skiing are used, as well as "combi" skis which may be used for either technique. Off-road rollerskis are a variation designed for rougher surface conditions.

Classic style rollerskis usually have wide wheels to improve balance and better simulate classic ski technique. The wheel diameter is often less than 75mm to reduce the overall weight of the rollerskis. A ratchet mechanism is installed in either the front or rear wheel of each classic rollerski to allow uni-directional travel and simulate propulsion from classic ski strides on snow. The non-ratcheted wheel on each classic rollerski is free-rolling.

Pneumatic rollerski wheels are also available but are especially rare and require pneumatic specific rollerskis. Pneumatic roller ski wheels have significantly greater diameter than non-pneumatic rollerski wheels. Both wheels on skate rollerskis are free-rolling.

Rollerski shafts may be composed of many different materials depending on the manufacturer and model. Wood was originally used, though this has mostly been replaced by aluminum, fiberglass, kevlar, carbon fiber or a combination of these materials. The wheelbase of skate rollerskis is typically around 610mm while classic rollerskis generally have a wheelbase of at least 700mm. The longer shafts of classic rollerskis help provide a better simulation of snow skiing. Many manufacturers sell junior roller skis, with shorter shafts to reduce the overall weight for younger skiers. Longer shafts generally provide straighter tracking and more stability. Rollerskis also feel more balanced when the bindings are properly mounted as close to balance point as possible. The bindings should never be mounted in a place that allows the cross country boot to be attached behind the balance point of the rollerski.

Wheels are connected to rollerski shafts using arms that are either integrated into the shaft design or mounted to the shaft using bolts. Most composite rollerski frames made of fiberglass or carbon fiber have aluminum arms mounted with bolts.

There are also types of roller skis that have 3 wheels, with one on the front and two on the back. These are less common more recently due to extra weight on rear created tail drop.

Roller skis with pneumatic tires (such as skikes) are available for rough pavement and off-road use.

Normal cross-country ski bindings and ski boots can be used with most roller skis, though some manufacturers produce special roller ski versions for the warmer weather use including Alpina, Botas, and Fischer. Cross-country ski poles are also used, with the basket replaced by a ferrule, essentially a reinforced carbide steel spike molded into strong plastic.

Extra protective clothing is recommended: full-finger gloves, helmet, eyewear, and knee and elbow pads. Many ski training programs require the use of helmets while roller skiing.

Roller skiing is most popular in Europe particularly France, Italy, Norway, Finland, Estonia, Sweden, and Russia, where there are many serious races and even a World Cup Circuit. In North America, roller skiing is popular in areas with many Nordic skiers such as Ontario, Alberta, Alaska, New York, Vermont, New Hampshire, Maine, Minnesota, Michigan, and Wisconsin.

Nordic blading

Nordic blading is a sport which uses ski poles with special tips and inline skates or roller skis. The sport has been practiced for over 80 years and is undergoing a revival. The benefits of Nordic blading are similar to that of cross-country skiing if performed correctly. Nordic blading can be more risky than inline skating as the poles complicate balance and coordination.

Types of techniques used

 One-skate (V1)
 Two-skate (V2)
 Offset 
 Free Skate
 Double Poling
 Diagonal Stride
 Double Pole-Kick (Step-Double pole)
 Downhill (Tuck, Free Skate, Slalom, etc.)

Equipment needed
Roller skis
Poles
Boots
Helmet
Protective eyewear (optional; mandatory in some competitions)
Gloves (recommended)
Knee and elbow pads (recommended)

See also
Nordic skiing
Nordic walking

References

External links

Cross-country skiing
Inline skating
Roller sports
Types of skiing